The Third Flare is a 1963 Soviet drama film directed by Richard Viktorov.

Plot 
The film tells about people who, being in the same trench, oppose the fascist tanks.

Cast 
 Stanislav Lyubshin as Vasiliy Loznyak
 Georgi Zhzhyonov as Zheltykh
 Spartak Fedotov as Petrov
 Nadezhda Sementsova as Lyusya
 Igor Komarov as Lukyanov
 Yuriy Dubrovin
 Leonid Davydov-Suboch as Aleksey Zadorozhniy
 Yevgeny Gvozdev as Kombat (as Ye. Gvozdev)
 Vladimir Prokofyev
 Ivan Zharov

References

External links 
 

1963 films
1960s Russian-language films
Soviet drama films
1963 drama films